The NBL1 West Grand Final Most Valuable Player is an annual NBL1 West award given to the best performing player in both the Women's Grand Final and Men's Grand Final. Known as the State Basketball League (SBL) Grand Final Most Valuable Player from 1996 (earliest known case) to 2019, the SBL was rebranded to NBL1 West in 2021.

Winners

References

Most Valuable Player